The  King Fahd National Library (KFNL) is the legal deposit and copyright library for Saudi Arabia. KFNL was established in 1983 in response to an initiative made by the people of Riyadh when King Fahd ascended the throne. The project was announced in 1983 and the implementation started in 1986. Now to this day, the library is known for its sustainability and up-to-date energy concepts.

Profile
The library was established in 1990 and is located in Riyadh. Among its special collections are the libraries of Ihsan Abbas, Sheikh Muhammad Ibn Abd al Aziz al Mani, Sheikh Abd Allah Ibn Muhammad Ibn Khamis, Sheikh Uthman Ibn Hamad al Haqil, Sheikh Muhammad Husayn Zaydan, Fawzan Ibn Abd al Aziz al Fawzan, Yusuf Ibrahim al Sallum, Muhammad Musa al Salim, Sheikh Muhammad Mansur al Shaqha, Sheikh Abd Allah Abd al Aziz al Anqari, Sheikh Abd Allah Ibn Umar al Sheikh, Sheikh Abd Allah Ibn Muhammad al Nasban, and Sheikh Husayn Ibn Abd Allah al Jarisi.

History of the library
There was a desire of the people of the city of Riyadh to express their feelings of love and loyalty to the Custodian of the Two Holy Mosques. King Fahd God's mercy – on his accession to power. So to express by setting up a memorial build, was the announcement of the Library Project at the ceremony, which held in the year (1403H.) which received the support of material from the state itself.

The building consists of ground floor topped with three floors covered by the planetarium so beautiful. It was designed by the nature of architectural modern decorated Arabic inscriptions and marble, and perhaps the most important features of this great cultural edifice hindsight on a mission vital area between King Fahd roads to the west by the Olaya Street of the east. Where this site gives the library the possibility of success in the performance of its role by a large margin due to the accessibility and clarity of the place and prominence, it is the heart of the modern Riyadh, is also available inside the library itself places to rest and wait.
The implementation of the project begun in 1406 H. under the supervision of the secretariat of the city of Riyadh, and in 1408 formed an interim administration; freed planning process development groups, organized and prepared, and put the nucleus of the administrative and technical her organs, and in 1409 H. the construction was built, furniture and equipment.
King Fahd National Library has been able during the brief period since its inception to achieve many of the ambitious achievements. That launched mainly from the composition of infrastructure in the organization and development of human resources and the development of library collections necessary and equipment. To carry out its tasks, and achieve their goals in the areas of documentation and preservation of the Saudi intellectual production. And provide information services, in line with the comprehensive development witnessed by the Kingdom of Saudi Arabia.
In the area of building the library Collectibles it has mastered many of the information printed materials, and audio-visual materials. Such as optical disks and the thumbnail, local documents, coins, rare books and manuscripts, as the library finally got the first batch of Arabic manuscripts and precious from Princeton University in the US, that were about photographs of all manuscripts and rare books. That the library received as a gift of His Royal Highness Prince Faisal bin Fahd bin Abdulaziz, General President of Youth Welfare – God's mercy.
Since the application filing system and international Numbering in 1414H, the library was able to record and indexing of many current books and periodicals, it also began in the preparation of the final arrangements for recording audio and video materials and deposited according to the national Filing system requirements. Thus, the library acquires them the largest group comprising the one place, and the documentation and registration operations carried out by the library changed the pattern of the estimated statistics prevailing, by the Saudi intellectual production volume. Both in the domestic sources or foreign, and since the library of the National Center for the deposit and registration became a contributing role positive improvement in the form of Saudi writers, and published, and by definition. Through indexing in during deployment and allocation of international standard numbers.
The library take care for the equipment and conservation systems, recovery care, and the restoration and maintenance of manuscripts and rare books, and the library has configure databases, and processes authentication mechanism, as well as access to sources of information on optical drives, and building internal information networks that help organize information and circulation.
In the area of information services, the Library provide information and answer to direct questions, and through different means of communication.
Library is also involved an active role in the local and Arab exhibitions to publish and display its publications and other Saudi intellectual production, along with communications, and cooperative programs, and the exchange of information and publications with Arab and foreign bodies, reflecting the cultural and civilizational role played by the library internally and externally.

Indexing
The library indexes the contents of Saudi periodicals such as original or translated essays, book reviews, thesis, bibliographic works, researches submitted to symposiums and conferences and published legislations for customers service beside indexing of Saudi and non-Saudi periodicals dealing with Saudi Arabia and Arab peninsula.

Collection maintenance
Sterilization:
To save its collection from damage due to abuse and climatic factors, the library sterilizes manuscripts, rare documents using modern tools.
1- Binding:
They is a binding unit for binding published and photocopied books. Rare books maintained before binding, then gold tooled.
2- Microforms:
In order to keep its collections safe, the library transfer newspapers, books, manuscripts and financial documents into microforms, this spares much space and keeps it from damage.
3- Photocopying:
The library provides photocopying services for its individual, organizational customers and for its own benefits, but has no circulation system, the photocopying services take into consideration the intellectual property rights.
4- Manuscripts and documents maintenance:
For the sake of safety of its collection of rare manuscripts and documents, the library has established an independent maintenance unit to keep these valuable collections.

Legal Deposit
One of the most library achievements is the legal deposit act that issued by the royal decree No. (M/26 on 7/9/1412 A.H.) . Since application of this act in 1414 A.H., the library started to register all what is published inside the kingdom and giving it a deposit number before publishing.
Regarding the retrospective deposit of old books, the library does its best to collect rare and old books through cooperation with the authors, gifts and purchasing of the first Saudi publications that are not available in the library or bookshops, the library has collected a lot of old and rare Saudi publications which enable the library to control Saudi intellectual property.

Publishing
King Fahd National Library Act assures the library role in contribution and publishing of researches, studies and library and information services guides, so, the library published a lot of books, references and guides to serve its customers.
To promote library and information services and the history of Saudi Arabia sources, the library issued (King Fahd National Library Journal), a semi-annual journal beside (King Fahd National Library Abstracts Bulletin).

Registration and International Standard Book Number for Saudi Arabia
The library had made and agreement with the International Center for Publication Registration and Specification of International Standard Book and Serial Numbers (ISBN, ISSN), to deal as a national center responsible for book registration, the numbers appear on Saudi publications, beside cataloguing in publication that improved the shape of Saudi publication, and unease  the procedure of bibliographic control in both Arab and international level, the library leads other Arab libraries in this field regarding the application of international standards as witnessed by international centers, though, the library provides the international centers in France and Germany with adequate control of Saudi publications including Saudi publishers and their addresses.
The international centers issue annual guides of publications published throughout the world including Saudi Arabia, therefore, Saudi publication became international and the libraries, information centers and the publishers became aware of Saudi publications, publishers and their addresses which made Saudi publication well acquainted worldwide, the library also provides UNESCO annually with a report on publishing and translation activity in Saudi Arabia, the library has also been selected as the national center for the deposit of IFLA publications.

Preparing information
The library receives annually so many inquiries and deep search questions which need data collection and prepare it in forms that suits the customer's need, the library made many bibliographies of Saudi intellectual property from books, periodicals and translations to publish in UNESCO and Arab Organization for Education, Culture and Science publications through Saudi ministry of education, the library also provides statistical data about publishing in Saudi Arabia for international organizations and researchers all over the world.

Reference services
The reference services provided to the library customers developed as the development of information resources that includes full text databases beside the main library database, the library receives many reference and research   inquiries directly or through telephone, the library issues library cards for its usual customers to enable them getting proper service.

Exchanging circulation
The library made an agreement with some Saudi libraries and information centers to apply exchanging circulation system, this system may include more Saudi libraries in future under the supervision of the library.

Computer output access
The library provides computer output for its customers, these outputs include bibliographical information and texts from different references and information resources.

Manuscript Heritage Safety
Manuscripts have a great importance in history, link tool between past and present, manuscript is a register of peoples heritage, their customs and traditions, culture and development, therefore, loss of manuscript means loss of history. Manuscript heritage safety act, issued by a royal decree No. (m/23) dated, (16/5/1422 A.H.) that represents an important ring in the chain of Saudi cultural system. This system is one of the most tasks of the national library. Through this system, King Fahd National library tries to register all the original manuscripts kept in the governmental and non-governmental institutions and individuals by giving it a number and a certificate of ownership that includes owner of the manuscript's name, the title, the author and the date of writing, this information help the owner in case of lost, sale or if he wanted to take it outside the kingdom.

Services offered to individual owners of original manuscripts
1-Registration certificate of manuscript.
2-Scientific form of manuscript data.
3-Manuscript photocopy upon owner's request.
4-Sterilization of manuscript, that makes it last.
5-Entering manuscript data in Saudi Union Manuscript Catalogue.

References

External links
 King Fahad National Library

1990 establishments in Saudi Arabia
Libraries established in 1990
Saudi Arabia
Buildings and structures in Riyadh
Libraries in Saudi Arabia